Hilmar Kaiser is a German historian who has a PhD from European University Institute, Florence, and works at Yerevan State University.

Works

References

20th-century German historians
Historians of the Armenian genocide
Academic staff of Yerevan State University
Living people

Year of birth missing (living people)
21st-century German historians